GTS Admiral W. M. Callaghan was first constructed to be used in an industrial capacity but later optioned by Military Sealift Command to be used in logistical work throughout the fleet to deal with the changing needs of the military. The ship was delivered in 1967 and was used for transport responsibilities during the Vietnam War. It has been used in a variety of different services in its history since it was initially launched, including the War on Terror in both Iraq and Afghanistan. The ship was named after Admiral William M. Callaghan who captained the battleship  and later became vital in overseeing the development of the modern US system of ready reserve ships at the Ready Reserve Fleet Alameda.

In August 1969, Admiral W. M. Callaghan transported the first battalion of the Pershing 1a Field Artillery Missile System from Port Canaveral to West Germany.

References

External links
 Ship's official page on Military Sealift Command 

1967 ships
Ships built by the Sun Shipbuilding & Drydock Company